Chuck Wolfe may refer to:
 Chuck Wolfe (executive) (born 1961), LGBT rights activist
Chuck Wolfe (baseball) (1897–1957), baseball pitcher

See also
Charles Wolfe (disambiguation)